Benjamin Franklin: An American Life is a non-fiction book authored by American historian and journalist Walter Isaacson. Published in 2003 by Simon & Schuster, the biographical work details the life and times of prominent U.S. statesman and Founding Father Benjamin Franklin. The book has received praise from multiple publications including Foreign Affairs and The Guardian.

Background and contents

Isaacson notes that Franklin's reputation has shifted based on time and place given the statesman's achievements and personality. Franklin, the author argues, "has been vilified in romantic periods and lionised in entrepreneurial ones" since "each era appraises him anew" and thus "in doing so reveals some assessments of itself." In broad terms, Isaacson describes Franklin as a quintessential figure of the Age of Enlightenment as well as one seen as a prototypical American by those to which the very concept was new. The author particularly argues that Franklin should get thought of as an important figure in the history of science.

In terms of Franklin's personal character, the author writes that the statesman possessed a sense of sociability in contrast to struggling somewhat with close intimacy. Franklin not only missed the weddings of both his daughter and his son but wasn't present at the death of his wife; as a father, he projected a certain coldness. However, Isaacson details that Franklin's inherently jovial nature came out in multiple meaningful friendships, particularly in terms of young women that the statesman genuinely engaged with intellectually.

The author states that Franklin's ambition and natural talent as a printer eventually earned the statesman a publishing empire. Isaacson describes the business achievements in depth and goes on to note the complexities of Franklin's political viewpoints. A major figure in the American Revolution, Franklin devoted his considerable abilities in support of the new nation.

In terms of Franklin's influence on American life, the author states that the statesman established a philosophical undercurrent of "practical benevolence" that has since endured in U.S. society. This pragmatic approach to existence stands in contrast to another influence, in Isaacson's opinion, that comes from the American Puritans and emphasizes a kind of idealistic vision and near-mysticism.

Reception

Novelist and poet Jay Parini wrote a supportive review for The Guardian, Parini lauding the work as "a lively, readable[,] and affecting book." Parini concluded, "Isaacson admires his subject deeply, and makes us admire... [Franklin] too." Foreign Affairs published a praising commentary by historian Walter Russell Mead as well. Labeling Franklin "the most genial and engaging" of the Founding Fathers, Mead remarked that Isaacson "produced a biography to match". In detail, Mead particularly stated that the author handled "the twists and turns of Franklin's political views with sensitivity and understanding" while additionally presenting "an eloquent case for considering Franklin a major figure in the history of science."

See also

2003 in literature

References

External links
Presentation by Isaacson on Benjamin Franklin, July 22, 2003, C-SPAN
Interview with Isaacson on Benjamin Franklin, October 4, 2003, C-SPAN
Presentation by Isaacson on Benjamin Franklin's legacy, May 11, 2016, C-SPAN 

2003 non-fiction books
American history books
American political books
Books about scientists
History books about the United States
Popular science books
Books about Benjamin Franklin